Jeju City is the capital of the Jeju Province in South Korea and the largest city on Jeju Island. The city is served by Jeju International Airport (IATA code CJU).

Located on an island off the Korean Peninsula, Jeju has mild, warm weather during much of the year. The city is a well-known resort, with prestigious hotels and public casino facilities. In 2011, 9.9 million passengers flew between the two cities of Seoul and Jeju, making the Gimpo–Jeju route the world's busiest passenger air route. Jeju welcomes over ten million visitors every year, mainly from the South Korean mainland, Japan, and China. The population of Jeju City is 486,306 people and 205,386 households (244,153 men and 242,153 women, February 2019). The population density is 470.03 (per square km, 2015).

History
The area of the city has played a central role in Jeju since before recorded history.  The Samseonghyeol, holes from which the three ancestors of the Jeju people are said to have come, are located in downtown Jeju City.

The city has grown quite rapidly since the 1970s. Shin Jeju, or "new Jeju", was created some decades ago, up the hill from the airport and houses many government buildings. The thatched roof buildings that were common throughout the city until the 1970s are gradually disappearing.

The city was separated from Bukjeju County in 1955. However, in 2005 Jeju Province voters approved a proposal to merge the city with Bukjeju County, also merging Seogwipo with Namjeju County to create two large cities directly administered by the province. That change was put into effect in July 2006.

In 2012 Sang-Oh Kim became mayor; he was formerly the Jeju regional president of National Agricultural Cooperative Federation.

Transportation
Jeju City is the principal transportation center for Jeju Province. It is home to the island's sole airport, Jeju International Airport; the Jeju-Seoul route is the world's busiest airline route.

In addition, its port is the largest on the island, serving the great majority of passenger and cargo vessels that visit the island. It also stands at the center of the island's road network. To travel throughout the city and island, various buses are available. A bus ride from Jeju City to Seogwipo (the second largest city on the island) is typically an hour.

Economy
Due to its central position in transportation, Jeju City sees the main share of tourist traffic to the island. Many tourists arrive at the city through the port terminal or airport, stay in the tourist hotels of the Sinjeju neighborhood, and stay within the city to visit various Jeju tourist attractions. These include Dragon's Head Rock (Yongduam, :ko:용두암) along the coast; the Samseonghyeol, three holes in the downtown area; Hallasan National Park in the interior; the country's tallest mountain, Hallasan; and world's largest botanical garden, Bunjae Artpia.

The city also sells many oranges for which Jeju is famous. Jeju City is surrounded by orange and mandarin farms.

Jeju Air has its headquarters in Jeju City.

Geography
In its former boundaries, Jeju City was 19.3 kilometers from east to west, and 10.2 kilometers from north to south. To the north, it looks across the Korea Strait at the southern coast of South Jeolla Province. To the south, it meets Seogwipo at the top of Hallasan, the island's sole mountain.

Demographics

Climate
Jeju City has a humid subtropical climate (Köppen: Cfa) with very warm summers and cool winters. In Holdridge classification, Jeju City has a warm temperate moist forest climate. Due to its location, Jeju City is one of the warmest cities in Korea. However, ocean effect snow brings winter precipitation such as snow showers with strong wind during the winter.

Administrative divisions
Jeju is divided into 19 neighbourhoods (dong), 4 towns (eup), and 3 townships (myeon):

Twin towns – sister cities

Jeju City is twinned with:
 
 Guilin, Guangxi, China
 Laizhou, Shandong, China
 Rouen, France
 Sanda, Japan
 Santa Rosa, United States
 Wakayama, Japan

Friendship cities
 
 Tokyo, Japan
 Beppu, Japan
 Hunchun, Jilin, China
 Kunshan, Jiangsu, China
 Loreley, Germany
 Yangzhou, Jiangsu, China
 Shanghai, China
 Sydney, New South Wales, Australia
 Dubai, United Arab Emirates 
  Wellington, New Zealand
  Taipei, Taiwan

Memorandum of Understanding
 Ulm, Germany

See also

List of cities in South Korea
Geography of South Korea

References

External links

City government website (in Korean)
Jeju City at Encyclopedia of Korean Local Culture

 

 
Cities in Jeju Province
Port cities and towns in South Korea